Jersey competed at the 2022 Commonwealth Games in Birmingham, England between 28 July and 8 August 2022. Having made its Games debut in 1958, it was Jersey's seventeenth appearance to date.

Cyclist Rhys Hidrio was the delegation's opening ceremony flagbearer.

Competitors
Jersey received a quota of 30 open allocation slots from Commonwealth Sport, of which 26 were accepted. This quota is used to determine the overall team in sports lacking a qualifying system.

The following is the list of number of competitors participating at the Games per sport/discipline.

Athletics

Two athletes were officially selected on 16 October 2021. Two more were added on 8 April 2022.

Men
Track & road events

Field events

Women
Field events

Boxing

On 27 April 2022, Jersey selected Tom Frame for the men's light-welterweight (63.5 kg) division.

Men

Cycling

Four cyclists were officially selected on 16 October 2021. Two more were added on 8 April 2022 and another on 2 June 2022.

Road
Men

Women

Track
Time trial

Pursuit

Mountain Biking

Gymnastics

One gymnast was officially selected on 16 October 2021.

Artistic
Men
Individual Qualification

Individual Finals

Lawn bowls

A squad of five men was officially selected on 16 October 2021. Event-specific selections will be made in due course.

Swimming

Three swimmers were officially selected on 16 October 2021, with a fourth added on 27 April 2022, and three more on 3 June 2022.

Men

Women

Mixed

Table tennis

Two players were officially selected on 3 April 2022.

Singles

Doubles

Triathlon

One triathlete was officially selected on 16 October 2021.

Individual

References

External links
Commonwealth Games Jersey Official site

Nations at the 2022 Commonwealth Games
Jersey at the Commonwealth Games
2022 in Jersey